2000 is the third studio album by American rapper Joey Badass. It was released on July 22, 2022 through Pro Era Records and Cinematic Music Group with license to Columbia Records. The album features guest appearances from Diddy, Westside Gunn, Larry June, Chris Brown, Capella Grey, and JID. Production of the album was handled primarily by Statik Selektah and Chuck Strangers, with contributions from Erick the Architect, McClenney, Mike Will Made It, Kirk Knight, and Cardiak.

Background
On May 11, 2022, Joey announced the title of his third studio album, with the original release date being planned for June 17, 2022, 5 days after the 10 year anniversary of the mixtape, 1999. However, the album was delayed by a month, with Joey revealing on social media that it was due to sample clearance issues. The album was eventually released on July 22, 2022.

Release and promotion
On March 3, 2022, Joey Badass released the first single from the album titled "Head High", along side a Colors Studio performance. On July 1, the second single, "Where I Belong" was released with an accompanying music video. The third single, "Survivors Guilt"  was released on July 7, which is known as "Steez Day" dedicated to the late Capital Steez. On July 15, the fourth single "Zipcodes", was released with a music video. In July 2022, Joey Badass went on a 20-date summer concert tour, called the 1999-2000 Tour, with Capella Grey as the opening act.

On September 2, the album was updated on digital streaming platforms, with the Statik Selektah-produced song "Let It Breathe" being added to the tracklist as the twelfth track on the album. The song was originally released as a music video on January 20, 2021 (Joey's 26th birthday) via YouTube, before releasing as an official single in August 2022.

Critical reception 

Rolling Stone noted Joey Badass for being a "charismatic hero" and some offered criticism towards the album's direction, noting "At times, 2000 strains under its ambition. It's unclear whether Bada$$ wants to build an Important Album or simply release something commensurate with his growing celebrity." Pitchfork gave a positive review of 2000, praising the album's production. "The wide-ranging production often makes it easy to ignore the rough spots. Classy instrumental interpolations and crossover beats. It's a testament to Joey’s growing ear that he sounds good on all of them." However, Pitchfork also called 2000 "underwhelming" in comparison to the buildup the album had since the release of 1999 in 2012.

Track listing

Notes
The track "Let It Breathe" (produced by Statik Selektah) was included as the twelfth track on a later version of the album released on Apple Music and Spotify.
 "Cruise Control" features additional vocals by Nas.

Sample Credits
 "The Baddest" contains a sample from "I Like It", written by Eldra DeBarge, Etterlene DeBarge, and William DeBarge, as performed by DeBarge.
 "Make Me Feel" contains a sample from "Something in the Way (You Make Me Feel)", written by Angela Winbush, as performed by Stephanie Mills.
 "Brand New 911" contains samples from "Total Satisfaction", written by Larry Bailey, as performed by Brief Encounter.
 "Zipcodes" contains uncredited samples from "Don't Say Hello, Don't Say Goodbye", written by Chude Mondlane, as performed by Shoody.
 "Show Me" contains samples from "Show Me How", written by Dragos Chiriac, as performed by Men I Trust.

Charts

References

2022 albums
Joey Badass albums
Cinematic Music Group albums
Pro Era albums
Albums produced by Mike Will Made It
Albums produced by Cardiak
Albums produced by Kirk Knight
Albums produced by Statik Selektah